Leon S. Brown (October 12, 1919 – October 14, 1990) was an American professional basketball player. He played collegiately for the University of Wyoming. Professionally, Brown played in five games for the Cleveland Rebels of the Basketball Association of America during the 1946–47 season.

BAA career statistics

Regular season

External links

1919 births
1990 deaths
American men's basketball players
Baltimore Bullets (1944–1954) players
Basketball players from Nebraska
Cleveland Rebels players
People from Hastings, Nebraska
Wyoming Cowboys basketball players
Forwards (basketball)